James Shead (born 19 August 1965) is a British auto racing driver. His father, Don was also a racing driver.

In 1988 he won class C in the British Touring Car Championship. He finished eighth overall in the championship in a Volkswagen Golf GTI. In the 1990 24 Hours of Le Mans, he finished third in class C2 and 25th overall for Team Mako alongside Robbie Stirling and Ross Hyett.

Racing record

Complete British Touring Car Championship results
(key) (Races in bold indicate pole position in class) (Races in italics indicate fastest lap in class - 1 point awarded 1987-1989 all races)

‡ Endurance driver.

References

External links

1965 births
Living people
English racing drivers
British Touring Car Championship drivers
24 Hours of Le Mans drivers
World Sportscar Championship drivers